The ICARI Spanish School is a language academy located in Cahuita, Talamanca, Costa Rica. ICARI is registered under Costa Rican laws with the name of Instituto Caribeño de Inglés ICARI de JyL S.A.. The school was founded in 2005 as a Costa Rican alternative to Spanish schools that were felt to be solely focused on profit.

References 

Language schools
Schools in Costa Rica